Beizangcun Town is a town in the west side of Daxing District, Beijing, China. It shares border with Huangcun Town to the north, Linxiao Road and Tiangongyuan Subdistricts to the east, Panggezhuang Town to the south, as well as Liulihe and Changyang Towns to the west. According to the 2020 census, Beizangcun Town was home to 35,391 residents.

The name Beizangcun refers to Beizang Village that preceded the current town.

History

Administrative divisions 
In the year 2021, Beizangcun Town was divided into 17 villages:

Gallery

See also 

 List of township-level divisions of Beijing

References 

Towns in Beijing
Daxing District